Douglas Albert Guest  (9 May 1916 – 18 November 1996) was an English organist, conductor, teacher and composer.

Education
Guest was born in Mortomley, Sheffield,  Yorkshire, England, and studied originally at the Royal College of Music and became Organ Scholar of King's College, Cambridge from 1935 until 1939.

Career
During the Second World War he served as a Major in the Royal Artillery and was involved in the battle for the liberation of Caen, Normandy. He was 'twice severely wounded'  sustaining a leg injury which left him with a permanent, though eventually slight limp. His first major appointment came in 1945 as Director of Music at Uppingham School. From there he became Organist of Salisbury Cathedral, a post which he held from 1950 until 1957, before moving to become Organist and Master of the Choristers at Worcester Cathedral. His final post was as Organist and Master of the Choristers at Westminster Abbey from 1963 until 1981.

Compositions and awards
His most well-known composition is a setting of Lawrence Binyon's poem, "For the Fallen", composed in 1971 for the Choir of Westminster Abbey. He also composed music for the organ, including a Voluntary for Easter, composed in 1956. His other appointments have included being professor at the Royal College of Music, and as an examiner for both the Royal College of Organists and the Associated Board of the Royal Schools of Music. In 1975 he was appointed CVO.

External links
Biography
Obituary

1916 births
1996 deaths
20th-century classical composers
Alumni of King's College, Cambridge
Cathedral organists
English choral conductors
British male conductors (music)
Composers for pipe organ
Musicians from Sheffield
English classical organists
British male organists
English classical composers
People educated at Reading School
Master of the Choristers at Westminster Abbey
20th-century British conductors (music)
20th-century English composers
English male classical composers
20th-century organists
20th-century British male musicians
British Army personnel of World War II
Royal Artillery officers
Male classical organists